Alejandro Millán (born July 10, 1980, Monterrey, Mexico) is the singer, keyboardist, and composer for band Hello Madness. After winning a music production contest by CONARTE, he released the album "Light and Life After Dusk". He founded the progressive band Elfonía in 2002, releasing the albums Elfonía and This Sonic Landscape.

Millán started playing piano and keyboards for Stream of Passion in 2004, releasing the studio album Embrace the Storm and the live CD/DVD Live in the Real World. He quit the group in 2007. He also contributed on Noah (2010), the debut album of Unwritten Pages. In 2012, he earned a degree in music at Los Angeles College of Music. His song "Feel Alright" was a finalist in the International Songwriting Competition 2012 competing for Best Rock Song and Song of the Year.

Discography

Studio albums

Elfonía
Elfonía (2003)
This Sonic Landscape (2005)

Stream of Passion
Embrace the Storm (2005)

Hello Madness 
Light and Life After Dusk (2008)

Live albums

Stream of Passion
Live in the Real World (2006)

References

1980 births
Living people
Heavy metal singers
Mexican pianists
Musicians from Monterrey
Stream of Passion members
Male pianists
21st-century Mexican singers
21st-century pianists
21st-century Mexican male singers